The Longquan Mountains are a low-lying range of mountains in Sichuan, China. They range from Deyang in the north to Leshan in the south. The Longquan are bisected by the Tuo River in the north that forms a -deep gorge through the mountains.

The Longquan Mountains are the westernmost detachment fold in the Sichuan Basin.  The other detachment folds the region are found in the east of the basin, so the Longquan stand out relative to the alluvial Chengdu Plain in the west and the Sichuan Basin's rolling hills to the east.  The Longquan Mountains have shown tectonic activity in the past, although pressure built up at the edge of the Sichuan Basin now tends to release along the Longmenshan Fault, further west.

The eastern suburbs of Chengdu reach the base of the Longquan in Longquanyi District.  Approximately 23% of the Longquan are still forested, while agricultural uses, temples, and small villages cover the remaining portions. Luodai Ancient Town, a popular tourist destination, is found at the foothills of the Longquan.  As a major north-south range directly to the east of Chengdu, most transportation links between the capital city and the rest of the Sichuan Basin cross through the mountains including the Chengdu–Chongqing Railway and G76 and G42 expressways.

References

Mountain ranges of Sichuan